|}
Neil Randal Bell (born 5 October 1947) is an Australian former politician. He was the Labor member for MacDonnell in the Northern Territory Legislative Assembly from 1981 to 1997. A teacher before entering politics, Bell organised opposition to Chief Minister Marshall Perron's bill to legalise euthanasia in 1995.

References

1947 births
Living people
Members of the Northern Territory Legislative Assembly
Australian Labor Party members of the Northern Territory Legislative Assembly